Camilla Josefine Holmgren (born 11 April 1993) is a Swedish ice hockey defenceman and member of the Swedish national ice hockey team, currently playing with Djurgårdens IF Hockey Dam of the Swedish Women's Hockey League (SDHL).

International career
Holmgren was selected for the Sweden women's national ice hockey team in the 2014 Winter Olympics. She played in all six games, not recording a point.

Holmgren made three appearances for the Sweden women's national under-18 ice hockey team, at the IIHF World Women's U18 Championships, with the first in 2009. This included winning a bronze medal in 2010.
 She represented Sweden at the 2019 IIHF Women's World Championship.

Career statistics

International career
Through 2013-14 season

References

External links

1993 births
Living people
Brynäs IF Dam players
Djurgårdens IF Hockey Dam players
Ice hockey players at the 2014 Winter Olympics
Olympic ice hockey players of Sweden
People from Älvkarleby Municipality
Swedish women's ice hockey defencemen
Sportspeople from Uppsala County